Sophie Austin (born 5 January 1984) is an English actress who started her career out in theatre once she left drama school but later moved to screen. She is best known for portraying Lindsey Butterfield in the British soap opera Hollyoaks, a role she held from June 2013 until her departure in May 2016. She is also known for portraying the wife of footballer Geoff Hurst, Judith, in ITV drama Tina and Bobby. Her work has included roles in Casualty, Moving On and Call the Midwife.

Personal life
In 2015, she married fellow actor Graeme Rooney, but the couple split the following year. In 2016, she began dating singer and Coronation Street actor, Shayne Ward. On 2 August 2016, the couple announced they are expecting their first child. On 2 December 2016, the pair welcomed their first child, a daughter named Willow May. In December 2017, Ward announced his engagement to Austin.  On 3 January 2022, the couple announced they are expecting their second child. On 11 June 2022, the pair welcomed their second child, a boy Reign Thomas

Filmography

References

External links
 

British actresses
Living people
1984 births
English soap opera actresses